Vadym Yevhenovych Yushchyshyn (born 23 November 1999) is a Ukrainian professional footballer who plays as a goalkeeper for Ukrainian club Veres Rivne.

References

External links
 
 

1999 births
Living people
Sportspeople from Lviv
Ukrainian footballers
Association football goalkeepers
FC Karpaty Lviv players
NK Veres Rivne players
FC Uzhhorod players
Ukrainian First League players